Music Industry Online (also called MIO) is an online music magazine that has been reporting on the South African music industry since December 1999 when it was known as PC Music.

History and profile
Music Industry Online was founded by Josh Adler in November 1999 as PC Music, with Adler himself as its editor Initially, PC Music, would send a monthly newsletter to about 50 subscribers, explaining the basics of using personal computers to make electronic music. The first issue was sent out in December 1999.The headquarters is in Johannesburg.

In 1998 Adler partnered with Jeff Fletcher - who had founded a discussion list for South African electronic musicians on the Hivemind Network, to create a small community of subscribers and a simple website. For a while, the PC Music newsletter would be distributed electronically each month, and then archived on the website. As the mailing list grew, Adler invited two of his computer science classmates in January 2001: Asher Lipson and Sam Hutchinson (now MIO'''s technical director)

The decision set in place an entirely new phase for PC Music, which then changed to Music Industry Online in 2005. This witnessed an influx of resources in the form of writers who updated the site with regular news and feature content, drawing audiences both South Africa and abroad. Forums and discussion boards were introduced and moderators elected to keep a watchful eye on the use of offensive behavior.

The content also started undergoing subtle changes, from being information based purely on how to make electronic music, to incorporating other music genres and all sectors of the music industry, namely Djing, Artists, Music Business, Education, Events, Music Reviews and the Music Tech sections.

It 2005 two more journalists joined MIO on a full-time basis; Taryn Lee-Bigger and Phash Ratshilumela.

Richard Rumney joined MIO as editor in chief in 2007. In 2007 Adler and Hutchinson decided to focus on MIO’s mother company, Prefix Technologies,Preditor Publisher CMS v1.6 released with Extra Tools and Ratings Module which they co-own and left MIO in the hands of Rumney and Ratshilumela. The same year, MIO was registered under a new umbrella term: MIO Media. Adler and Hutchinson are still active partners.

From October 2008 to early 2011, MIO and the Southern African Music Rights Organisation (SAMRO) ran a section called SA Music Good News, which only focuses at writing about positive developments in the South African Music Industry.

Rumney remained MIO’s Editor in Chief until October 2009, when Ratshilumela took over.Music Industry Online is only accessible on the web and sends a regular newsletter. It is seen as one of South Africa's major online music magazines. The magazine generally strives to be a catalyst for growth in the South African music industry and this has seen a number of initiatives aimed at encouraging the South African music industry. After a period of lower growth, in October 2014, Music Industry Online relaunched  under new ownership. In 2014, MIO'' was bought from the current owners by 882 People Media  and Zethu Zulu took over as editor.

Editorship
Josh Adler: 1999-2005
Richard Rumney: 2007-2009
Phash Ratshilumela: 2009- 2013
Zethu Zulu: 2014–Present

References

External links
 Official website
 SA Music Good News, retrievable on the official page and on SAMRO 

1999 establishments in South Africa
Online music magazines
South African music websites
Monthly magazines published in South Africa
Magazines established in 1999
Mass media in Johannesburg